Thomas Bryn (29 March 1782 – 6 September 1827) was a Norwegian jurist, magistrate and civil servant. He served as a representative at the Norwegian Constitutional Assembly.

Thomas Bryn was born at Kongsberg in Buskerud, Norway. Bryn was the son of Thomas Thomassen Bryn (1756-1830) who was director of mining at the Kongsberg Silver Mines. He first worked as a printer's assistant and later clerk in Buskerud. After a few years of service, he traveled to the University of Copenhagen to study law. In 1805, he earned his law degree and returned to Kongsberg. He some found work in the administration of District Governor Herman Wedel Jarlsberg. In 1808, he married Susanne Lind (1783 - 1827). The couple had eight children. The family lived at Klubbgaarden in Larvik and owned the Lunde farm in Tjølling. In 1810 he was appointed judge in  Østre Råbyggelaget. In 1816, he became Magistrate (sorenbirkeskriver) in Larvik.

Thomas Bryn represented Råbyggelaget Amt (now Aust-Agder) at the Norwegian Constituent Assembly in 1814, together with Even Torkildsen Lande and Ole Knudsen Tvedten. At Eidsvoll, he supported the position of the union party (Unionspartiet).

He was elected to the Parliament of Norway in 1814 and 1827. His diary from 1814 was later printed. When Henrik Wergeland was preparing his work on Norway's constitutional history, he came across this diary and used it as one of their sources. It was also used in an impeachment case in 1845.

References

External links
Representantene på Eidsvoll 1814 (Cappelen Damm AS)
 Men of Eidsvoll (eidsvollsmenn)

Related Reading
Holme Jørn (2014) De kom fra alle kanter - Eidsvollsmennene og deres hus  (Oslo: Cappelen Damm) 

1782 births
1827 deaths
People from Kongsberg
People from Larvik
University of Copenhagen alumni
Norwegian jurists
Fathers of the Constitution of Norway
Members of the Storting
Norwegian diarists